Christoph Albert "Chris" van der Klaauw (13 August 1924 – 16 March 2005) was a Dutch politician and diplomat of the People's Party for Freedom and Democracy (VVD).

From 19 December 1977 to 11 Septembter 1981, he was Minister of Foreign Affairs in the first Van Agt cabinet. He then became the Dutch ambassador to Belgium (1982–1986) and Portugal (1986–1989).

Decorations

References

External links

Official
  Dr. Ch.A. (Chris) van der Klaauw Parlement & Politiek

 

 

 

 

 

1924 births
2005 deaths
Ambassadors of the Netherlands to Belgium
Ambassadors of the Netherlands to Portugal
Commanders of the Order of Orange-Nassau
Dutch expatriates in Belgium
Dutch members of the Dutch Reformed Church
Knights of the Order of the Netherlands Lion
Leiden University alumni
Ministers of Foreign Affairs of the Netherlands
People's Party for Freedom and Democracy politicians
Permanent Representatives of the Netherlands to the European Union
Permanent Representatives of the Netherlands to NATO
Protestant Church Christians from the Netherlands
Politicians from Leiden
20th-century Dutch civil servants
20th-century Dutch diplomats
20th-century Dutch historians
Writers from Leiden